Róbert Mak (born 8 March 1991) is a Slovak professional footballer who plays as a winger for Sydney FC and the Slovakia national team.

Club career

Early career
Mak, a native of Bratislava, began playing football at the youth squad of the local club Slovan Bratislava. When he was 13, he joined Manchester City Academy. There he played with his countrymen Vladimír Weiss and Filip Mentel. He progressed to Manchester City Reserves aged 17, but never got a chance at the senior squad. He is a 2007–08 FA Youth Cup winner.

1. FC Nürnberg

On 11 June 2010, Mak signed a three-year contract for 1. FC Nürnberg for an undisclosed fee. He enjoyed time on the pitch right from the start and completed the season in Germany's top flight with 22 appearances established himself as a dependable option on the right flank of the attack. He scored his first Bundesliga goal in a 3–1 defeat against 1. FC Kaiserslautern on 20 November 2010. He stayed in the club for four seasons, however their relegation to second-tier football coincided with the expiration of his contract. Legia Warsaw made an attempt to sign with him, but PAOK's offer and the opportunity to play in the UEFA Europa League brought him to the Toumpa Stadium.

PAOK

2014–15 season
On 19 July 2014, he signed a three-year contract with PAOK playing in Super League Greece. He enjoyed time on the pitch right from the start, and helped PAOK to lead the championship until December 2014, but poor results made the club fall in the league table to third place. On 22 February 2015, PAOK returned to winning ways after beating Veria 3–1 which ended a disappointing period of bad results for the club. He completed the 2014–15 Superleague Greece season with seven goals (third in his first season after Facundo Pereyra and Stefanos Athanasiadis) and five assists (second after Giannis Skondras).

2015–16 season
On 16 July 2015, in the preliminary round of the UEFA Europa League PAOK was beaten 2–1 in the first leg in Croatia against Lokomotiva with Mak scoring the lone goal. In the second leg against Lokomotiva Zagreb, Mak scored a brace, with one of them being a right footed shot from more than 35-yards out, in a 6–0 win to advance. On 20 August, in the first leg of the Europa League playoffs against Brøndby IF, Mak had a hand in all five goals, as he netted a hat-trick, created the second goal, and teed up Garry Rodrigues for the third. On 12 September, in his third appearance for the 2015–16 season he scored his first goal in a 3–0 away win against Veria. Two weeks later, he scored in extra time giving his club the victory against Atromitos. On 1 October, in a home match against Borussia Dortmund in the Europa League, Mak contributed a 34th-minute goal in a 1–1 draw. In late October, it was reported that Mak was in talks with the club regarding a contract extension until 2019. On 5 November 2015, Mak reduced the club side's arrears in added time in a 2–1 away loss for Europa League against FC Krasnodar.
 On 30 November, he was substituted off the pitch in a 3–1 win over Kalloni after sustaining a knee injury. On 6 December, he gave the lead by scoring the first goal in a 2–1 home win against Panionios. Four days later, he scored his ninth goal in this year's Europa League to force a surprise defeat on Borussia Dortmund, who qualified in second place from Group C despite the loss. Mak ran onto a Giannis Mystakidis throughball, knocked it beyond goalkeeper Roman Weidenfeller and cut home from a tight angle.

On 30 January 2016, he gave the lead to his club after an assist from Dimitris Pelkas, in a 1–1 home draw in the 20th day of the league against Atromitos. On 4 March, after the episodic semi-final derby for the Greek Cup against champions Olympiacos, that never finished due to excessive episodes, Mak received four match ban and a €250 fine after his red card. On 11 April, in his return to action scored sealing a 2–0 home win against Levadiakos. After a good season with the club, PAOK, according to Real News, started negotiations offering to the player double wages on a new three-year deal.

After a successful UEFA Euro 2016 with the national team, Mak was no longer considered to be a member of PAOK, as the Slovak winger had farewelled all his teammates and the members of the club at the pre-season squad's hotel in Netherlands. The administration of the Greek club confirmed that there were three official transfers bids for him and he had taken leave of absence, in order to start negotiations with the interested sides.

Zenit St. Petersburg

On 22 July 2016, Zenit and PAOK officially announced the transfer of Mak to the Russian club, for about €3.5 million. The 25-year-old international, who had scored 20 goals in 45 appearances with the Greek club during 2015–16 season, passed the medical examinations and signed a four-year contract with the 2007–08 UEFA Cup winners.

Mak scored his first goal for Zenit on 11 September in a match against Arsenal. He came on the pitch on the 46th minute, substituting Oleg Shatov and scored 20 minutes later, on the 66th minute. Mak scored the third goal in the match, which Zenit won by 5–0.

After a poor season, despite a good early start, Mak was linked with a move back to PAOK for the next season on a loan basis. PAOK would cover 60% of his contract by paying €800,000 while the player's purchase clause would be set at €2.5 million.

PAOK loan
On 3 August 2017, Mak opened the score in a 2–0 home win game for the 2nd leg of UEFA Europa League third qualifying round against Olimpik Donetsk, after an assist of Diego Biseswar. It was his first goal after his return to PAOK. It was reported, that PAOK did not intend to sign Mak permanently in the summer of 2018. He scored five goals in 37 official performances in all competitions during 2017–18 season.

Konyaspor
On 30 January 2020 Mak's signing with Konyaspor was announced. After being advised by Zenit's manager, Sergei Semak, that his play time may continue to remain limited, due to high number of foreigners in the squad, Mak had moved to the Süper Lig side to maintain play time, to be of use for the national team. He was signed for half-season

He made his debut on 1 February 2020, in an away fixture against Antalyaspor. He came on as a second-half replacement for Farouk Miya. The match concluded in a goal-less tie. In upcoming fixtures, he also made appearances against Göztepe, Kayserispor and Kasımpaşa, being featured in the starting XI against the latter two.

In late March, during the COVID-19 pandemic, Mak had announced, that if tested positive he intends to terminate his contract with Konyaspor and travel to Bratislava, to reunite with his family, despite the agreement to keep the foreign players with their clubs. Mak feared further restrictions and the closure of the club's training center. He also claimed he didn't believe that the 2019–20 season would be completed. He was critical of authorities' late decision to suspend the Süper Lig season and enact pandemic spread prevention measures.

On 30 March 2020, it was announced that Mak and Konyaspor had terminated the contract by agreement.

Ferencváros
On 29 September 2020, he was member of the Ferencváros team which qualified for the 2020–21 UEFA Champions League group stage after beating Molde FK on 3–3 aggregate (away goals) at the Groupama Aréna.

On 20 April 2021, Ferencváros won the 2020–21 Nemzeti Bajnokság I season by beating archrival Újpest FC 3–0 at the Groupama Arena. The goals were scored by Myrto Uzuni (3rd and 77th minute) and Nguen (30th minute).

On 28 July 2021, he scored the third goal for Ferencváros against FK Žalgiris in the 2021-22 UEFA Champions League qualifying phase at the LFF Stadium. Ferencváros won the match 3–1 in Vilnius, Lithuania.

Sydney FC 
On 9 August 2022, Robert Mak signed for Australian professional football side Sydney FC. This came after a lackluster previous season for Sydney FC that saw them miss the finals and hence release numerous players to refresh the squad with international talent. After finding success in Europe and Sydney's need for a prolific winger, the move appeared a logical and much needed one. Mak scored his first goal for Sydney FC against Melbourne Victory on 8 October. This came in an unfortunate 3-2 defeat, with Manchester United star Luis Nani providing an impressive performance that saw Sydney FC face defeat in their first game at the new Allianz stadium. Mak's goal is also the first goal to be scored at the brand new stadium and home of Sydney Fc, Allianz Stadium.

Following this, Mak provided numerous impressive performances for Sydney, including a goal in the friendly win against Scottish Champions, Celtic FC on 17 November 2022.

International career
Mak was called up to the national team for a friendly match vs. Denmark that was held on 15 August 2012, but remained an unused substitute. He made his debut for Slovakia national team against Belgium on 6 February 2013 as a 61st-minute substitute for winger Miroslav Stoch. Belgium defeated Slovakia 2–1.
On 8 September 2014, Slovakia have begun their UEFA Euro 2016 qualification with a 1–0 away win against Ukraine. Even though Ukraine were better at the start of the match, Jan Kozak's side took the lead in the 18th minute, when Mak drifted in off his flank and was put clean through on goal. Mak was able time to steady himself, take a touch, get his head up and pass the ball into the near post to give the visitors the lead, and eventually the victory. The moment was later recalled as the beginning of a successful qualification, which led to Slovakia's first appearance at the European Championship. On 17 November 2015, he scored two goals for first time in his international career against Iceland in a preparation friendly match for Euro 2016.
He won his first trophy with Slovakia in 2018, when Slovakia won the 2018 King's Cup. Mak played in both games against UAE (2–1 win) and Thailand, scoring the second goal of a 3–2 victory in the final match against the home side.

Mak continued to make regular appearances under Pavel Hapal and even Štefan Tarkovič, appearing under the latter at UEFA Euro 2020. Following Tarkovič's departure and lower play-time at club level, Mak fell out of regular national team nominations for the entirety of 2022. He was re-nominated by Francesco Calzona for the start of UEFA Euro 2024 qualifying campaign due to apparent shortage of wingers.

Career statistics

Club

International

Slovakia's score is listed first, score column indicates score after each Mak goal.

Honours

Manchester City
FA Youth Cup: 2007–08

PAOK
 Greek Cup 2017–18

Zenit
Russian Premier League: 2018–19
Russian Super Cup: 2016

Ferencváros
Nemzeti Bajnokság I: 2020–21, 2021–22
Magyar Kupa: 2021–22

Slovakia
King's Cup: 2018

Individual
Peter Dubovský Award: 2011, 2012

References

External links
 
 

1991 births
Living people
Footballers from Bratislava
Association football wingers
Slovak footballers
Slovakia international footballers
Slovakia youth international footballers
Slovakia under-21 international footballers
Slovak expatriate footballers
Manchester City F.C. players
1. FC Nürnberg players
PAOK FC players
FC Zenit Saint Petersburg players
Konyaspor footballers
Ferencvárosi TC footballers
Sydney FC players
Bundesliga players
Super League Greece players
Russian Premier League players
Süper Lig players
Nemzeti Bajnokság I players
A-League Men players
UEFA Euro 2016 players
UEFA Euro 2020 players
Slovak expatriate sportspeople in England
Slovak expatriate sportspeople in Germany
Slovak expatriate sportspeople in Greece
Slovak expatriate sportspeople in Russia
Slovak expatriate sportspeople in Turkey
Slovak expatriate sportspeople in Hungary
Expatriate footballers in England
Expatriate footballers in Germany
Expatriate footballers in Greece
Expatriate footballers in Russia
Expatriate footballers in Turkey
Expatriate footballers in Hungary